The 56th New York Film Festival took place from September 28 to October 14, 2018.

Main Slate

References 

New York Film Festival
2018 film festivals
2018 in New York City